Penicillium glandicola is an anamorph species of the genus of Penicillium which produces penitrem A, patulin, 2,4,6-trichloroanisole and roquefortine C

References

glandicola
Fungi described in 1985